Hyphessobrycon clavatus is a species of South American tetra, belonging to the family Characidae. It is a pale golden green color, with its belly being even paler. It has an orange midlateral line. Below the midlateral line is a thick black stripe that fades around the gills. Their fins have white tips. They are known to reach about 3 centimeters (1.2 inches) in length. Its species name, clavatus, is derived from the Latin term clava lat, meaning club-shaped. Hyphessobrycon clavatus is known to inhabit the waters of Peru. As a pelagic fish, they swim near the surface of the water. They have seen limited use in the fish trade.

General References 
 Hyphessobrycon clavatus Zarske, 2015
 Hyphessobrycon clavatus Zarske, 2015  
 Hyphessobrycon clavatus spec. nov. - A new tetra from Peru (Teleostei: Characiformes: Characidae)

Characidae
Taxa named by Axel Zarske